Bjørg Løhner Øien (10 May 1928 – 20 February 2015) was a Norwegian figure skater. She competed at the 1952 Winter Olympics in Oslo. She was Norwegian champion in figure skating in 1952.

Results

References

External links

1928 births
2015 deaths
Norwegian female single skaters
Olympic figure skaters of Norway
Figure skaters at the 1952 Winter Olympics
20th-century Norwegian women